WCMU-FM (89.5 FM) is a public radio station in Mount Pleasant, Michigan. The station, owned by Central Michigan University, is a National Public Radio member station, airing a news/talk format along with a variety of other programming. It is the flagship station of a network called CMU Public Radio made up of five other affiliate stations in Northern Michigan.

Programming

CMU Public Radio offers a number of jazz and blues programs, including Nightside Jazz and Blues, Take Five, The Juke Joint and Destination Out. These primarily air in nighttime and early morning timeslots, aside from the weekday morning music/arts program Mosaic, an afternoon block of classical music on Mondays-Thursdays, and the majority of the station's weekend schedule. Locally produced weekend programs include The Beat and Homespun. Most of the station's talk and news programming comes from National Public Radio or via syndication from Public Radio International.

The station was MAB Public Station of the Year for 2002. Staff producers David Nicholas, Rick Westover, Jamie Lynn Gilbert, Sara Bingham and Eileen LaTarte have also won state awards.

History
WCMU-FM was originally a 10-watt campus radio station at 90.1, signing on on April 6, 1964.  During its early years, the station broadcast a wide variety of programming aimed at the campus population of the university, including classical, popular music, and progressive rock.  By 1969 the station was an affiliate of the National Educational Radio Network, which became NPR in 1970, and since then, the station has broadcast primarily classical and jazz music and news.  WCMU-FM moved to 89.5 with 100,000 watts of power in the mid-1970s, and in 1978 began to add a series of rebroadcaster stations around central and northern Michigan, beginning with WCML-FM in Alpena.

On March 1, 2023 WCMU-FM and its simulcasters switched to public news/talk and launched an all-classical format on its HD2 subchannels.

Affiliates
The station also serves most of Northern Michigan, including the eastern Upper Peninsula, through a network of affiliate stations:

WCMW Harbor Springs and WWCM Standish were both commercial FM stations before joining the CMU Public Radio network.  What is now WCMW was originally WLTO, a country music station.  96.9 WSTD in Standish was originally a satellite-fed oldies station and then moved to a full-service Adult Contemporary music format (with simulcasts of the evening news from WNEM-TV 5) until it went dark in November 1999. The 96.9 frequency was donated to CMU Public Radio and it was on the air with WCMU programming a year later.

In addition to the full-power affiliate stations listed above, CMU Public Radio is also broadcast on a translator station, W236BU, at 95.1 FM in Traverse City.  The translator began operations in 2011, and is listed in the FCC database as a translator station of WCMW-FM Harbor Springs.

WCMU serves the Sault Ste. Marie/Newberry radio market via affiliate station WCMZ, but its signal normally does not reach Newberry. That community was formerly served by Northern Michigan University's similar public radio/NPR/jazz station WNMU-FM via its translator station W216AI, however the translator's license was cancelled on June 17, 2020.

WUCX-FM Bay City simulcasts WCMU-FM generally in the evening hours; that station is owned by CMU, which jointly run WUCX with Delta College.

WCMU-FM, WCML-FM, WCMW-FM, and WUCX-FM all broadcast in HD Radio.  Each of the four CMU Public Radio stations broadcasting in HD also offer an HD-2 side channel featuring an NPR news and talk format; the side channels debuted in January 2012.

References

External links
WCMU-FM
Michiguide.com - WCMU-FM History

CMU-FM
NPR member stations
Central Michigan University
Radio stations established in 1964
1964 establishments in Michigan